RNCP may refer to :

 National Centre for Physics, academic physics and mathematical sciences national research institute located in Islamabad;
 Répertoire national des certifications professionnelles, French National Repertory of Vocational Certifications.